The Conservative Synagogue Adath Israel of Riverdale (CSAIR), founded in 1954, is a Conservative, egalitarian congregation and a member of the United Synagogue of Conservative Judaism. The synagogue is located in the Riverdale, Bronx, neighborhood of New York City. The congregation's spiritual leader is Rabbi Barry Dov Katz, who was appointed to the position in 1998.

History
The Conservative Synagogue of Riverdale was founded in 1954, with Max Kadushin serving as its first rabbi. The first building to be erected by the new congregation was its Hebrew school. 

In 1962, a new sanctuary, designed by architect Percival Goodman, was dedicated and the community started to grow. In 1973, the Conservative Synagogue merged with Adath Israel of the Grand Concourse. When the two joined, a plaque was dedicated: "We loved our house of worship. It enriched our lives and uplifted our souls."

CSAIR has daily morning and evening services, regular holiday services, an additional monthly havurah alternative service, extensive child-focused religious and educational services, the Marsha Dane Hebrew School, and various adult education programs.

2000 terror attack
On October 8, 2000, the eve of Yom Kippur, a group of four Palestinian-American men attacked the synagogue with Molotov cocktails, which they threw through the synagogues glass door. Mazin Assi, one of the attackers, was convicted of attempted arson, weapons charges, and hate crimes, and sentenced to a maximum of 15 years in prison. Assi said he threw the firebombs at "the  rich Jews in Riverdale" because he alleged they send money to Israel for "killing people." 

When Assi appealed, arguing that his act was not a hate crime and therefore he should not attract the longer sentence that a hate crime attracts, the New York Court of Appeals unanimously rejected his argument and ruled in 2010 that a person can be guilty of a hate crime even if the violence is directed at a building, rather than a person. The ruling upheld two lower court rulings that had reached the same conclusion. Assi, who had grown up in the Palestinian territories, had already sought parole twice, and been denied parole twice.

Notable members

Ruth Westheimer (born 1928), better known as Dr. Ruth, German-American sex therapist, talk show host, author, professor, Holocaust survivor, and former Haganah sniper.

Notable rabbis
Norman Salit (1896-1960)

See also

2005 Los Angeles bomb plot - effort by a radical Islamic group to bomb a number of synagogues, military bases, and an Israeli consulate
2009 Bronx terrorism plot – plot by four American Muslim men to blow up two synagogues and shoot down military airplanes 
2011 Manhattan terrorism plot – effort by two Muslim Arab-Americans to bomb a synagogue

References

External links
 

Buildings and structures in the Bronx
Synagogues in the Bronx
Conservative synagogues in New York City
Terrorist incidents in New York City
Jewish organizations established in 1954
Percival Goodman synagogues
Riverdale, Bronx
Synagogues completed in 1962
21st-century attacks on synagogues and Jewish communal organizations in the United States